Douglas Parker  is a Canadian voice actor and animation director. He has been active in the industry since 1985. He has cast, and directed many animated shows and films. He also has voiced characters in several cartoons and anime; he is probably best known for his work in ToddWorld, which was nominated as an outstanding children's animated program. His character Terrorsaur in Beast Wars: Transformers is also well-known, as well as Starscream. Doug also provided the voice of Prince Adam in The New Adventures of He-Man (1990).

Filmography

Voice over roles 
 At Jesus' Side - Roman Soldier
 Barbie and the Rockers: Out of this World - Various
 Barbie and The Sensations: Rockin' Back to Earth - Various
 Beast Wars: Transformers - Terrorsaur, Starscream
 Bucky O'Hare and the Toad Wars - Additional Voices
 Camelot: The Legend - Guard
 Camp Candy - Additional Voices
 Candy Land: The Great Lollipop Adventure - Jolly, Gloppy
 Captain N: The Game Master - Mega Man
 Conan the Adventurer - Skulkur, Dregs, The Kari Dragon, Windfang, Venturas, Zogar Sag
 Dragon Ball - Shao, Shenron (1995 dub)
 Dragon Ball Z (Ocean dub) - Bubbles, Gregory, Raspberry, Mez, Icarus/Higher Dragon
 Dragon Tales - Wyatt the Wishing Well, Bird
 Fat Dog Mendoza - Pink-Haired Alien, Carl Nussbaum, Patron #2 Arnie, Dave the Dung Beetle
 Funky Fables - Misc.
 George of the Jungle - Undead Rhino
 Generation O! - Mr. O!
 Greatest Heroes and Legends of the Bible
 G.I. Joe: A Real American Hero - Additional Voices
 Goodtimes Fairy Tales - Miscellaneous Characters
 Jester Till - Lamme, Bird Announcer, Doctor
 Kissyfur - Jolene
 Let's Chop Soo-E
 Make Way for Noddy - Sly
 Milo's Bug Quest - Nikolai
 Ninja Turtles: The Next Mutation - Shredder
 Personality Software
 Pocket Dragon Adventures - Walter
 Ranma ½ - Chemistry Club Leader (Episode 8) (English dub)
 RoboCop: Alpha Commando - Additional Voices
 Sleeping Beauty - Misc
 Spiff and Hercules - Additional Voices
 Street Fighter - Wong Who (Episode: "Final Fight")
 Street Sharks - Bad Rap, Spittor, Haxx
 Tales From the Far Side - Miscellaneous Characters
 Tales From the Far Side II - Miscellaneous Characters
 The Adventures of Corduroy - Additional Voices
 The Adventures of T-Rex - Additional Voices
 The Brothers Grunt - Frank, Tony, Dean, Bing, Sammy, Perry, Various
 The Cramp Twins - Announcer
 The Magic Trolls and the Troll Warriors
 The New Adventures of He-Man - Prince Adam, Hoove, Wall Street, Meloc
 The New Adventures of Kimba The White Lion - Additional Voices (English dub)
 The Wonderful Wizard of Oz - Wizard of Oz
 Transformers: Armada - Tidal Wave
 Transformers: Energon - Tidal Wave, Mirage
 Warriors of Virtue - Yee, Chi
 Weird-Oh's - Additional Voices
 Zoids - Vulcan
 Zoids Fuzors - Vulcan

Live action roles 
 Warhead - Penn

Staff work

Casting director 
 A Klondike Christmas
 Barbie and the Rockers: Out of this World
 Barbie and The Sensations: Rockin' Back to Earth
 Beast Wars: Transformers
 Camp Candy
 Devil Kings
 G.I. Joe: A Real American Hero
 G.I. Joe: Operation Dragonfire
 In Search of Santa
 RoboCop: Alpha Commando
 Sengoku Basara
 The New Adventures of He-Man
 Under the Skin
 Weird-Oh's

Voice director 
 Ark
 At Jesus's Side
 Ben Hur
 Devil Kings
 Donner
 Dragon Ball
 Dragon Warrior
 Funky Fables
 Greatest Heroes and Legends of the Bible
 G.I. Joe: A Real American Hero
 G.I. Joe: Operation Dragonfire
 Heroes on Hot Wheels
 In Search of Santa
 Legends of Chima
 RoboCop: Alpha Commando
 Rudolph the Red-Nosed Reindeer: The Movie
 Rudolph the Red-Nosed Reindeer and the Island of Misfit Toys
 Sengoku Basara
 Spiff and Hercules
 Tales From the Far Side
 The Animated Adventures of Tom Sawyer
 The Bots Master
 The Brothers Grunt
 The Wonderful Wizard of Oz
 ToddWorld
 Under the Skin
 Video Power (The Power Team segments)
 Weird-Oh's

Miscellaneous crew 
 Air Bud: Gold Receiver - Parrot ADR
 Bitsy Bears - Casting Production Assistant
 Camp Candy - Recording Assistant
 Captain N: The Game Master - Talent Coordinator
 The Curious Case of Benjamin Button - ADR Recordist
 Head Above Water - 2nd Assistant Sound Editor
 Little Golden Book Land - Talent Coordinator
 My Little Pony Tales - Casting Advisor
 National Treasure - Assistant Sound Effects Editor
 Rudolph the Red-Nosed Reindeer and the Island of Misfit Toys - Assistant to Producer
 Stellaluna - Dialogue Director
 The Curious Case of Benjamin Button - ADR Recordist
 The New Adventures of Little Toot - Director
 ToddWorld - Director
 Video Power - Dialogue Director (The Power Team segments)
 Warriors of Virtue - ADR Casting
 Who Shot Rock & Roll: The Film - Mix Technician

External links 
 

Living people
Canadian casting directors
Place of birth missing (living people)
Year of birth missing (living people)
Canadian voice directors
Canadian male voice actors